The Game Rating and Administration Committee (GRAC) (formerly the Game Rating Board until December 23, 2013) is the South Korean video game content rating board. A governmental organization, the GRAC rates video games to inform customers of the nature of game contents.

Initially, the Korea Media Rating Board, a governmental organization, rated video games just like other entertainment media. However, a controversy occurred because the Korea Media Rating Board rated an arcade gambling game Sea Story as if it were suitable for everyone, with allegations of misconduct. The Korean government responded to the controversy by creating the GRB in 2006 and making it the only rating organization for rating video games in South Korea. 

The GRAC has been criticized as one of the elements of the Internet censorship in South Korea, and has been criticized for being the same as censorship of China. By law, games sold in the country must be rated by GRAC prior to sale; additional regulations stipulate age and real name verification for certain mature-audience titles, as well as regulations on location-based games.

Age rating symbol 
The GRAC currently uses four different age ratings.

The content of the game may have representations of anti-societal idea, distortion or profanity of religion and public morals that would be harmful to children under 15 emotionally and physically.
The content and motif of the game may have representations of obscenity, violence, speculation, etc. that would be harmful to children under 15 (indirect and restricted representation of sexuality, violence, improper language (expletives) and low level of reproduction of gambling spirit (arousing of passion for excessive use of gaming money, or dependence on one's luck).

Content descriptors

See also 
 Entertainment Software Rating Board
 Video game content rating system

References

External links 
  
  

2005 establishments in South Korea
2013 establishments in South Korea
Censorship in South Korea
Entertainment rating organizations
Government agencies of South Korea
Video game organizations
Video game content ratings systems